Yi-soo, also spelled Yi-su or Lee-soo, is a Korean unisex given name. Its meaning depends on the hanja used to write each syllable of the name. There are 35 hanja with the reading "yi" and 67 hanja with the reading "soo" on the South Korean government's official list of hanja which may be used in given names.

People
People with this name include:
Kim Yi-Su (born 1953), South Korean judge
Lee Soo (이수; born Jeon Gwang-cheol, 1981), South Korean singer, member of MC the Max

Fictional characters
Fictional characters with this name include:
Song Yi-soo, in 2011 South Korean television series 49 Days
Seo Yi-soo, in 2012 South Korean television series A Gentleman's Dignity
Han Yi-soo, in 2013 South Korean television series Shark

See also
List of Korean given names

References

Korean unisex given names